Bjørn Johansen (born February 3, 1944) is a Norwegian ice hockey player. He was born in Oslo, Norway and represented the clubs Rosenhoff IL and Hasle/Løren IL. He played for the Norwegian national ice hockey team, and  participated at the Winter Olympics in 1968 and 1972.

References

1944 births
Living people
Ice hockey players at the 1968 Winter Olympics
Ice hockey players at the 1972 Winter Olympics
Norwegian ice hockey players
Olympic ice hockey players of Norway
Ice hockey people from Oslo